The Honor 4C (also known as Huawei G Play Mini) is a low-end Android smartphone produced by Honor, a sub-brand of Huawei. It was released in April 2015.
It is the second low-end phone of Huawei's subrand Honor. Honor 4C has a 5.0-inch liquid crystal display and runs on Android 6 Marshmallow operating system after latest update.
It is also the third phone by Honor which uses HiSilicon Kirin chipset.

Specifications
The phone has 2 GB of random access memory, 8 gigabytes of internal storage and is connectable using Bluetooth and Wi-Fi.

References

Android (operating system) devices
Mobile phones introduced in 2015
Huawei mobile phones
Discontinued smartphones